Mandhir Kooner (born 27 September 1995) is an English international freestyle wrestler. He has represented England at the Commonwealth Games and won a bronze medal.

Biography
In 2018, Kooner won a silver medal at the English Championships, beaten by Ben Pollin in the heavyweight category but gained revenge in 2022, when he won the Championships.

In 2022, he was selected for the 2022 Commonwealth Games in Birmingham where he competed in the men's 125 kg category, winning the bronze medal.

References

1995 births
Living people
English male wrestlers
British male wrestlers
Wrestlers at the 2022 Commonwealth Games
Commonwealth Games bronze medallists for England
Commonwealth Games medallists in wrestling
20th-century English people
21st-century English people
British sportspeople of Indian descent
Medallists at the 2022 Commonwealth Games